Brian Godding (born 19 August 1945, Monmouth, South Wales) is a pop, rock and jazz rock guitarist.

Reviews
Regarding his 1988 solo album Slaughter on Shaftesbury Avenue, Dave Wayne in the New Gibraltar Encyclopedia of Progressive Rock, said:

Reviewing the same album for the Dorset Echo, Marco Rossi said:

He was featured in 'Crossing Bridges', a 1983 music programme based around jazz guitar improvisation, and broadcast by Channel 4

Discography

As leader
 Slaughter on Shaftesbury Avenue (Reckless Records: RECK16, 1988)

As sideman
With Mike Westbrook
The Cortège (Original Records, 1982)
On Duke's Birthday (Hat ART, 1985)
Pierides (Jazzprint, 1986)
The Dance Band (Core, 1987)
London Bridge Is Broken Down (Virgin Venture, 1988)

With Kevin Coyne
Bursting Bubbles (Virgin Records,  1980)
Sanity Stomp (Virgin Records, 1980)
Pointing the Finger (Cherry Red Records, 1981)

With Centipede
Septober Energy, (Neon: NE 9, 1971)

With Magma
 Köhntarkösz (Vertigo, A&M, Seventh Day, 1974)

Godding is listed as a band member on a 1977 album by a band called Mirage who released an album on Compendium Records called Now You See It. Also listed are George Khan(Tenor/Alto/Soprano sax/Flute, Steve Cook (Electric/String basses) and Dave Sheen on drums. It was recorded in Oslo I think as Compendium Records were based there. This album is an excellent but obviously little known album of classic jazz fusion material on which all the band members excel. The track listing is as follow:
Side 1
King's Head (Khan)
Always Leaving (Khan)
Time Less Words (Godding)

Side 2
Elephants' Tales (Khan)
Ballade (Khan)
Underneath The Arches And Beyond (Godding )

Source is the album cover as I have been unable to find any other information on the band or album elsewhere.

References

External links
Brian Godding's official website

Godding @ Olliehalsall.co.uk

1945 births
Living people
Welsh jazz musicians
Welsh jazz guitarists
Welsh songwriters
Welsh rock guitarists
British male guitarists
People from Monmouth, Wales
Centipede (band) members
British male jazz musicians
Solid Gold Cadillac members
British male songwriters